Erbao Township, is a township-level division located in the oasis city of Turpan, in the Xinjiang Uyghur Autonomous Region of the China.

References

Turpan
Township-level divisions of Xinjiang
Populated places in Xinjiang